Gond-i Shahanshah ("the army of the Shahanshah"), also known by its Arabicized form of Jund-i Shahanshah, was the name of the 4,000 Daylamite elite unit of the Sasanian king. They originally lived in Daylam, but were resettled in Ctesiphon by Khosrow II (r. 590-628), probably some time after 600. After the Sasanian Empire suffered a major defeat in 636 to the Arabs at the battle of al-Qadisiyyah, the Gond-i Shahanshah defected to the Arabs, converted to Islam, and settled in Kufa, where they had their own quarter.

Sources 
 
 

Infantry units and formations of the Sassanian Empire
Guards units of the Sasanian Empire
Military units and formations established in the 7th century
Converts to Islam from Zoroastrianism
History of Kufa
Daylamites
Khosrow II